Juan Damián Matos Rodríguez (born 4 April 1963) is a retired Spanish Paralympic judoka. He won a gold medal at the 1992 Summer Paralympics.

References

1963 births
Living people
Sportspeople from Valladolid
Spanish male judoka
Paralympic judoka of Spain
Judoka at the 1992 Summer Paralympics
Judoka at the 1996 Summer Paralympics
Medalists at the 1992 Summer Paralympics
20th-century Spanish people
21st-century Spanish people